Dmitri Monya (born September 10, 1988) is a Russian professional ice hockey winger who currently plays for HC CSKA Moscow of the Kontinental Hockey League (KHL).

Career statistics

References

External links

Living people
1988 births
Russian ice hockey right wingers
Avtomobilist Yekaterinburg players
HC Belgorod players
HC CSKA Moscow players
HC Dynamo Pardubice players
HC Khimik Voskresensk players
HC Nové Zámky players
HC Sibir Novosibirsk players
HC Yugra players
THK Tver players
Russian expatriate sportspeople in Slovakia
Russian expatriate sportspeople in the Czech Republic
Russian expatriate sportspeople in Latvia
Russian expatriate ice hockey people
Expatriate ice hockey players in Latvia
Expatriate ice hockey players in the Czech Republic
Expatriate ice hockey players in Slovakia
Ice hockey people from Moscow